Alan Nigel Charles Wadey (born 12 September 1950) is a former English cricketer.  Wadey was a right-handed batsman who bowled right-arm medium pace.  He was born at Billingshurst, Sussex.

Wadey made a single first-class appearance for Sussex against Yorkshire at the County Ground, Hove in the 1975 County Championship.  Wadey batted twice in this match, ending unbeaten without scoring in each innings.  With the ball he took a single wicket, that of Richard Lumb for the cost of 44 runs from 8 overs.  Yorkshire won by 2 wickets.  This was his only major appearance for Sussex.

References

External links
Alan Wadey at ESPNcricinfo
Alan Wadey at CricketArchive

1950 births
Living people
People from Billingshurst
English cricketers
Sussex cricketers